Stephen Appleton (born in Surrey, England) is a British singer, songwriter and producer.

At the age of fifteen, Appleton began playing piano in a Soho restaurant improvising jazz and playing covers from the likes of Elton John and Billy Joel.
 
After graduating from a music college in London he was quickly signed by Spinnin’ Record’s based in The Netherlands, and recognised as one of their key writers. 
During his time there the label recognised his vocal and performing ability and, with Warner Music Group, released Appleton’s debut single “Supposed To Do”.

Appleton has since become a platinum-selling writer with artists including Tiësto, Cher Lloyd, Klingande and Filatov & Karas, with number 1s in Russia, Poland, Singapore. In December 2019, Appleton co-wrote and was the featured artist on the Tiësto single, "Blue".

Discography

Singles

As lead artist

As featured artist

References

External links
 Official website

1989 births
Living people
English pop singers
English male singers
English songwriters
English record producers
People from Surrey
21st-century English singers
21st-century British male singers
British male songwriters